Qaraózek district is a district of the Republic of Karakalpakstan in Uzbekistan. The capital lies at the town Qaraózek.

The district contains one town Qaraózek and eight village councils Mádeniyat, Berdaq, Esimuzaq, Algabas, Qarabuga, Qarakul, Qaraózek, Qoybag.

References

Karakalpakstan
Districts of Uzbekistan